I Hate the Music is a compilation album by Australian pop singer John Paul Young. The album was released in September 2009 to coincide with Young's induction into the ARIA Hall of Fame in August 2009.
It was re-released in April 2012 to celebrate Young's 40th Anniversary in music industry and his Order of Australia (OAM) for his services to charity and the music industry.

The album includes tracks from 8 of his 9 studio albums to date.

Track listing

Release history

References 

John Paul Young albums
2009 compilation albums
Compilation albums by Australian artists
Sony Music Australia albums